Charlotte Eagar (born 1965) is a British journalist, filmmaker, novelist, and communications consultant. She is co-producer and co-founder of the Trojan Women Project, combined drama therapy and multi-media strategic communications project for Syrian refugees. Scooter man – the short rom-com directed by Kirsten Cavendish, which Eagar co-wrote and produced with her husband William Stirling and Kirsten Cavendish - won Audience-rated Best of the Fest at the LA Comedy Festival (2010) and Palm Springs (2010) and was selected, amongst other festivals, for Cannes Short Film Corner (2010). The documentary about the Trojan Women Project’s 2013 pilot programme in Jordan, Queens of Syria, directed by Yasmin Fedda - which Eagar Executive Produced - has won many awards, including Best Director in the Arab World at the Abu Dhabi Film Festival (2014) (for a full list of awards see the director Yasmin Fedda's website)  and is studied on the syllabus at UCLA and Austen University Texas, amongst other universities. The Trojans (2019), the performance film of the Trojan Women’s latest Glasgow-based drama therapy project, was selected by the Scottish Government as a Special Edition Performance for the Edinburgh International Culture Summit 2020.

For her work as a foreign correspondent in Bosnia during the war (1992-6), Eagar was runner up in the David Blundy Award for Foreign Stringer of the Year (1993) and runner up in Cosmopolitan Woman of the Year (Media Section) 1994.

Early life and education

Eagar grew up in the UK and read Classics at Oxford. She had previously studied at Edinburgh University. She is currently finishing a part-time MSc in Islamic and Middle Eastern Studies at Edinburgh. She studied script-writing and film-making at the London Academy of Media, Film ,and TV, and at Raindance.

Career

After a brief stint as an apprentice dress-designer for the couturier Victor Edelstein in 1986, Eagar headed to journalism. She started working at the Evening Standard and Daily Mail while still at university. Her first foreign story was covering the 1989 Romanian Revolution for the Scotsman as a freelancer, while still at Oxford. After spending some months covering the collapse of the former USSR in 1992, based in Kyiv and Moscow, and travelling and reporting widely throughout the Caucasus and Central Asia, as a freelancer, Eagar moved to Bosnia, where she became the Observer’s Balkans Correspondent, based in Sarajevo. She covered the war in Bosnia until its end in 1996.

In the mid-nineties, Eagar moved back to London and across into features; as well as freelancing and various editing positions, she worked as Acting Deputy Features Editor of the Scotsman, with a column on Scotland on Sunday. In 1998, she became Assistant Features Editor of the Mail on Sunday, and, in 1999, Deputy Features Editor of the Sunday Telegraph.

In 2002 she moved to Rome and then Sarajevo to write a novel set in Sarajevo during the war, The Girl in The Film(2008).

In 2004 she returned to the UK, contracted as a Contributing Editor on the Evening Standard magazine, specializing in investigative features, in the UK and abroad.

Eagar also continued to write for many other publications – including Prospect and the Spectator. In the summer of 2004, she was sent by the Times magazine to Baghdad to write about the boom in governments sub-contracting security in war zones to private security firms and the looting of artworks from Baghdad’s Iraq Museum. She wrote frequently for the Mail on Sunday, including being sent on assignment to Afghanistan (2006) to investigate alleged fraud by the British government on Afghan poppy farmers in Helmand, and to South Korea (2008) to investigate refugees being smuggled from North Korea to South Korea.

In 2009 Eagar moved back to Conde Nast as Senior Editor of Tatler, producing 12 pieces of investigative ‘Vanity Fair’ style journalism a year. She continued to write for other publications, such as the Sunday Times Magazine, including covering the Somali pirate crisis.

In 2012, she joined Newsweek as a Contributing Editor and was sent on assignment to various countries, including Italy and Bosnia, where she covered Srebrenica’s DNA identification program  amongst other stories.

In 2016, she wrote a piece for Granta, about a Syrian family making the journey by boat and land from Turkey to Germany.

Films

In 2009-10 Eagar and her husband, William Stirling, co-wrote and co-produced their first film, Scooterman, a short rom com starring Ed Stoppard and Georgina Rylance and directed and co-produced by Kirsten Cavendish (to watch Scooterman click on a link cited here). Rather to their amazement, Scooterman got into Cannes Short Film Corner (2010) and won Audience-rated Best of the Fest at the LA Comedy Festival and Palm Springs. It also opened the Santa Barbara Film Festival. It was optioned by Hollywood producer David Wicht to make a feature. Since then, Eagar and Stirling have co-written several feature scripts and a TV series in various stages of development. Their scripts Venice Vegas and Jane’s Abattoir won and were runner up in the British Film Centre’s pitching competition at Cannes in 2011 & 2012.

Eagar has also Exec Produced and produced several documentaries as part of her work at the Trojan Women Project, including Queens of Syria, The World to Hear, and The Trojans 2019 Edinburgh Festival, and Queens of Syria 2016 Young Vic/Developing Artists co-production theatrical performance films.

Humanitarian and Strategic communications work - Trojan Women Project

Since 2007, Eagar had occasionally devised and run communication campaigns, firstly for her ownprojects eg The Girl in the Film. Scooter man,

In 2013, inspired by training films Eagar and Stirling had written and directed for M&S’s Kenyan partner Vegpro in Nairobi with a Kenyan cast of Vegpro workers, Eagar and Stirling set up the Trojan Women Project, a Not For Profit combined psycho-social support and strategic communications drama project for refugees. https://www.trojanwomenproject.org

The Trojan Women Project (Initially called the Syria Trojan Women Project)  was first set up at the request of Oxfam and backed by the British charity Prospero World (the UK registered charity No1163952.

Currently working with Syrian refugees, the project has been designed to help refugees overcome their isolation, depression, and trauma, through regular drama workshops, while giving the participants, through plays and films, a platform to tell their stories to the world. It creates both a process and a product. The concept involves refugees working their own stories into the text of a play – most usually Euripides’ great anti-war tragedy, The Trojan Women - through regular workshops, and then performing their play at the highest possible artistic level.

As part of the strategy of TWP, Eagar and Stirling commissioned and Exec Produced a documentary, Queens of Syria (directed by Yasmin Fedda and produced by Itab Azzam and Georgina Paget), about the project, which has won many awards. (The film was produced by Refuge Productions Ltd, which Eagar and Stirling and others set up to support the Trojan Women Project.)

As per the aim of TWP, their original 2013 Jordan-based production, Syria: The Trojan Women, directed by the Syrian director Omar Abusaada, with an all-female cast of Syrian refugees - and the accompanying documentary Queens of Syria - were widely covered by the international media. In 2014, the project and the Syrian cast also featured in a special skype Gala event at Georgetown University, hosted by Georgetown’s Laboratory for Global Performance and Politics and at Columbia University, hosted by their Centre for Core Curriculum and their Global Mental Health program.

Since 2013, the Trojan Women Project hahasince continued this pattern of drama workshops in Jordan, Europe, and the UK, with performances combined with accompanying films. The Trojan Women Project and their films are now shown and studied at many US and UK universities, (including Oxford, UCLA, Edinburgh, Yale and Austen University, Texas) and have also featured in various academic articles.

TWP other projects include the Jordan-based first ever Arabic adaption of the musical Oliver! (2015) with a junior cast of Syrian refugees children, supported by Sir Cameron Mackintosh ,and Welcome to Zaatari/We Are All Refugees (2015), an English/Arabic radio drama, set in Zaatari camp, with a Syrian refugee cast, that was broadcast on BBC Radio 4 and BBC Arabic. Their 2016 adaptation of The Trojan Women, also called Queens of Syria, directed by Zoe Lafferty and co-produced with the Young Vic and the theatrical charity Developing Artists, toured the UK. It was extremely well-received, with four and five-star reviews, focussing on the courage of the cast. Footage from Queens of Syria 2016 Young Vic/Developing Artists Theatrical Performance Film was included in the British Museum’s 2019 Troy: Myth and Reality exhibition. The documentary of the tour, The World to Hear (2018), directed by Charlotte Ginsborg and Anatole Sloan and produced by Eagar and Stirling, was screened at the Glasgow Film Festival and the London International Documentary Festival in 2017/18. They also ran Kaleidoscope, radio drama writing workshops for Syrian refugees in Aberdeen, Glasgow, and Heidelberg in 2016-17, backed by the UNHCR.

In 2018-19 Eagar and Stirling ran drama workshops for Syrian refugees re-settled in Glasgow, backed by Glasgow City Council, which culminated in The Trojans, their third adaptation of Euripides’ Trojan Women, directed by Victoria Beesley, with amixed-genderr Syrian cast. The Trojans premiered at Platform Theatre in Glasgow in February 2019 and was given four star reviews. The play then went to the Edinburgh Festival in August 2019 with the Pleasance EICC, playing to an audience of over 500 people, again, with four-star reviews. The documentary about this project, directed by Charlotte Ginsborg, is currently in post-production.

In 2020, The Trojans were asked by the Scottish Government to be one of their key partners in the Edinburgh International Culture Summit.

During Covid, TWP has adapted, and now runs Encrypted, a pprogramof regular zoom black cocomedy-dramaroups, working with Syrian participants from all over the Middle East, Europe, and the UK.

Academic Reach

The films made as part of the reach of the Trojan Women Project are regularly screened with Q&A panels, at festivals and at US and UK universities, often studied as part of their syllabuses, on courses ranging from Drama and Diversity (UCLA) to Classics (Oxford, Cambridge, Edinburgh, Brown, Yale, Austin Texas, etc) and Psychology (Columbia). TWP's work has also been the subject of several academic articles eg.

Books

In 2008, Charlotte Eagar published The Girl in the Film, a novel set in Sarajevo during the war and post war years. She currently working on a book about theafter-effectss of the 1745 uprising on Bonnie Prince Charlie and his adherents.

ReferencesaBitwise

Living people
1965 births
English women journalists
English women novelists
Newsweek people
English women non-fiction writers